Vinko Puljić (born 8 September 1945) is a Bosnian prelate of the Catholic Church who has been a cardinal since 1994. He was the archbishop of Vrhbosna from 1991 to 2022.

Early life and education
The twelfth of thirteen children, Vinko Puljić was born in Banja Luka, Bosnia and Herzegovina (then part of Yugoslavia), to Ivan and Kaja Puljić. His mother died when he was three-years-old, and his father then remarried. In addition to his family, young Vinko's spiritual formation was deeply influenced by the Trappist Mariastern Abbey, located not far from his native village. One of the monks helped Vinko's father to send his son to the minor seminary of Zagreb. Father Ante Artner sold his motorbike and gave the proceeds to Vinko's father, who did not have enough money to pay his board there. Vinko then studied philosophy and theology at the major seminary of Đakovo.

Priesthood
Puljić was ordained to the priesthood by Bishop Stjepan Bauerlein on 29 June 1970, and then served as a chaplain in the Diocese of Banja Luka until 1973, whence he became an official of the diocesan curia. He was a parish priest in Sasina from June to November 1973, and in Ravska from 1973 to 1978. In 1978, he was named spiritual director of the minor seminary of Zadar. During this time, he also served as a confessor at a Benedictine monastery and organized spiritual retreats for priests, seminarians, and nuns.

In 1987, he returned to the Diocese of Banja Luka, where he served as a parish priest in Bosanska Gradiška. He was later transferred to Sarajevo in 1990 as vice-rector of the Sarajevo major seminary.

Episcopal ministry

On 19 November 1990 Puljić was appointed Archbishop of Vrhbosna by Pope John Paul II. He thus became the sixth archbishop of that see after the reconstruction of the ordinary ecclesiastical hierarchy in 1881 after the Ottoman occupational rule which had lasted more than four centuries. He received his episcopal consecration on 6 January 1991 from John Paul II himself, with archbishops Giovanni Battista Re and Justin Francis Rigali serving as co-consecrators, at St. Peter's Basilica.

Puljić was created Cardinal-Priest of S. Chiara a Vigna Clara by John Paul II in the consistory of 26 November 1994. He was 49 years old when he became the youngest member of the College of Cardinals. On 18 October 2001 he was invested as bailiff of the Grand Cross of Honour and Devotion in the Sovereign Military Order of Malta. Puljić was one of the cardinal electors who participated in the 2005 papal conclave, which selected Pope Benedict XVI. He served as president of the Bishops' Conference of Bosnia and Herzegovina from 1995 to 2002, and again from 2005 to 2010. On 18 September 2012 Pope Benedict XVI named him as a Synod Father of the 13th Ordinary General Assembly of the Synod of Bishops which was held in October 2012.
Cardinal Puljić participated in the 2013 papal conclave, which elected Pope Francis.

Views

Role during the Bosnian War

When the Bosnian War broke out in 1992, Archbishop Puljić immediately became involved in helping the thousands of refugees and exiles, mobilizing all the forces of the local Church.
During the war, he frequently risked his life while making pastoral trips to his parishes, so he was imprisoned during one visit for twelve hours by the Serbian military in Ilijaš, running a serious risk when he rode in a United Nations Protection Force tank to Vareš. John Paul II once said to him, "When I imposed hands on you...to consecrate you in the office of Pastor of the Church of Sarajevo, I had no idea that very shortly your cross would be so heavy and your cup so bitter."

Status of Međugorje
Cardinal Puljić, speaking at the 2004 assembly of the Synod of Bishops, said that the unity of the Church is threatened by the disobedience of the Franciscan monks serving at Međugorje, who "impose their own points of view". In 2006, the Episcopal Conference of Bosnia and Herzegovina considered setting up a commission to examine the alleged Marian apparitions. He later served on the commission chaired by Cardinal Ruini.

Relations with Muslims
Cardinal Puljić has said that before the war, relations with Muslims were very good, but that in recent times, the situation has somewhat deteriorated. The first sign was the arrival of humanitarian aid from Arab countries. It was distributed only to Muslims, while at the same time it was prohibited to give it to Christians. In 2012, Cardinal Puljić warned about the spreading of Wahhabism in Southeastern Europe, especially in Bosnia and Herzegovina, stating that the state authorities are not capable of preventing it. At the same time he warned about the discrimination of Catholics in the Bosnian society, demanding equal treatment for Catholics in employment, education, and other areas. He confirmed that he will continue to try to establish a dialogue and peaceful coexistence between Christians and Muslims in Bosnia and Herzegovina, which was disrupted by the recent war in the country.

Women and marriage
In May 2016, Puljić drew controversy  after appealing to women in a sermon in Zadar, Croatia not to have sexual intercourse before marriage so that they wouldn't become a "štraca", which is a local slang word for a "whore". The word became a meme, as well, spawning the creation of various Facebook groups numbering thousands of people. The cardinal claimed in response that his words were "taken out of context" despite different implications based on the transcript of the sermon, but concedes that the word he used is too harsh.

Clergy sex abuse
In February 2019, Puljić said in an interview that there were several cases of clergy abuse in Bosnia and Herzegovina as well, but that he did not report them to the police. Puljić did not publish the names of the abusers or the place where they were at the service.

Personal life
On 2 December 2020, it was confirmed that Puljić tested positive for COVID-19, amid its pandemic in Bosnia and Herzegovina; by 12 December, he recovered.

References

External links

Biography @ catholic-pages.com
Meeting with Cardinal Puljic, Bosnia and Herzegovina U.S. Institute of Peace Event, May 2006 (Audio available)

1945 births
Living people
Bishops of Banja Luka
Croats of Bosnia and Herzegovina
Bosnia and Herzegovina cardinals
Archbishops of Vrhbosna
Bishops appointed by Pope John Paul II
21st-century Roman Catholic archbishops in Bosnia and Herzegovina
20th-century Roman Catholic archbishops in Bosnia and Herzegovina
Cardinals created by Pope John Paul II
P